Agency 1 is a First Nations reserve in the Canadian province of Ontario in the northwest. , there is no permanent population.  The Indian reserve is shared among four First Nations: Couchiching First Nation, Mitaanjigamiing First Nation, Naicatchewenin First Nation and Nigigoonsiminikaaning First Nation.

References

External links
 Indian and Northern Affairs Canada profile

Anishinaabe reserves in Ontario
Ojibwe reserves in Ontario
Saulteaux reserves in Ontario
Communities in Rainy River District